The Liverpool Homeopathic Hospital was a hospital in Liverpool, England, that specialized in homeopathic treatments.

History

The facility was founded as the Liverpool Hahnemann Hospital and Dispensaries in 1887. The hospital building at 42-56 Hope Street, designed by F & G Holme, is an example of the Queen Anne revival style. It is now a Grade II listed building. It was the first hospital in the United Kingdom to contain early hydraulic lifts and an innovative heating and ventilation system. It joined the National Health Service in 1948. Renamed as the Hahnemann Hospital in 1969, it was eventually closed in 1976. It later became part of Liverpool John Moores University.

References 

Defunct hospitals in England
Homeopathic hospitals in the United Kingdom
1887 establishments in England
1976 disestablishments in England
Grade II listed buildings in Liverpool
Unused buildings in Liverpool
Grade II listed hospital buildings